Ephoria mendozata is a moth in the Apatelodidae family. It was described by Paul Dognin in 1923. It is found in Paraguay.

References

Natural History Museum Lepidoptera generic names catalog

Apatelodidae
Moths described in 1923